José Luis Gutiérrez Bastidas (born 3 March 1993) is an Ecuadorian football midfielder who plays for Manta.

Club career
He played at L.D.U. Quito and L.D.U. Portoviejo before joining FK Novi Pazar.  He joined Serbian SuperLiga side FK Novi Pazar in February 2015, alongside his compatriot José Mina. However, at the end of the season he returned to Ecuador and signed with Deportivo Cuenca. After ending the year playing with Cuenca in Ecuadorian Serie A, Gutiérrez joined Colón Portoviejo playing in Ecuadorian Serie B.

International career
He was part of Ecuadorian U-20 team at the 2013 South American Youth Football Championship.

Honors
LDU Quito
 Copa Sudamericana: 2011 (runner-up)

References

External links
 Detailed career at ecuafutbol.org
 Luis Gutiérrez stats at utakmica.rs
 

1993 births
Living people
People from Santo Domingo de los Colorados
Association football midfielders
Ecuadorian footballers
L.D.U. Quito footballers
L.D.U. Portoviejo footballers
FK Novi Pazar players
C.D. Cuenca footballers
Manta F.C. footballers
Ecuadorian expatriate footballers
Ecuadorian expatriate sportspeople in Serbia
Expatriate footballers in Serbia
Serbian SuperLiga players